Protolamellodiscus is a genus of monopisthocotylean monogeneans in the family Diplectanidae. All species of Protolamellodiscus are parasites of marine perciform fishes of the families Lethrinidae, Nemipteridae, Serranidae and Sparidae.

Species
According to the World Register of Marine Species, the following species are included in the genus:

 Protolamellodiscus convolutus (Yamaguti, 1953) Oliver, 1987 
 Protolamellodiscus raibauti Oliver & Radujkovic, 1987 
 Protolamellodiscus senilobatus Kritsky, Jiménez-Ruiz & Sey, 2000 
 Protolamellodiscus serranelli (Euzet & Oliver, 1965) Oliver, 1969  (Type-species)

References

Diplectanidae
Monogenea genera
Parasites of fish